Saint-Pierre is a concrete building in the commune of Firminy, France. The last major work of  Le Corbusier, it was started in 1973 and completed in 2006, forty-one years after his death.

History
Designed to be a church in the model city of Firminy Vert, the construction of Saint-Pierre was begun in 1971, six years after Le Corbusier's death in 1965. Due to local political conflicts it remained stalled from 1975 to 2003, when the local government declared the mouldering concrete ruin an "architectural heritage" and financed its completion. The building was completed by the French architect José Oubrerie, Le Corbusier's student for many years.

It has been used for many different purposes, as a secondary school and as a shelter.  As the secularist French state may not use public funds for religious buildings, Saint-Pierre is now used as a cultural venue.

Impact on architecture
In the World Architecture Survey of 2010, by Vanity Fair magazine, the building was ranked as second in the rankings of the top structures built in the twenty-first century, receiving four votes. American deconstructionist architect Peter Eisenman asserted in his response that this building is the most important structure built since 1980.

See also 
 World Architecture Survey

References 

 vishal

External links
 Le Corbusier in Firminy
 Guide to the Le Corbusier Correspondence and Photographs on the Design for l'Eglise de Firminy 1964
 Article by Jonathan Barnes Architecture and Design
  City of Firminy website on Saint-Pierre

Le Corbusier buildings in France
Monuments historiques of Loire (department)